Trypauchenopsis intermedia, the bearded eel goby, is a species of goby native to fresh waters from the Atlantic coast of South Africa to the Pacific island of Guam.  This species grows to a length of  TL.  This species is the only known member of its genus.

References

Amblyopinae
Marine fish of South Africa
Fish of Bangladesh
Fish of the Philippines
Fauna of Sumatra
Monotypic fish genera
Fish described in 1903